The Tikhir people, also known as the Tikhir Naga, are a Tibeto-Burman Naga ethnic group inhabiting in the Northeast Indian state of Nagaland. According to the 2011 census, the population of the Tikhir people in Nagaland was 7,537. They are recognised as a Scheduled Tribe (STs) by India.

Regional Festival
They celebrate "TSONGLAKNYI" festival, which is observed from 9–12 October every year. The word 'tsonglaknyi' is made up of two words: "Tsong" means Shield and "lak" means sanctification. Tsonglaknyi basically is a festival of the sanctification of Shield. It also means sanctification of the weapons along with their wealth and valuable assets, as well as the purification of the men folk before going out for head hunting (earlier days). In short, it is a festival of purification. This festival is one of the most important among the Tikhir festivals celebrated, stretching for four days.

References

Scheduled Tribes of Nagaland
Naga people
Ethnic groups in Northeast India